Tallow wood is a common name for several plants and may refer to:

Eucalyptus microcorys, native to eastern Australia
Ximenia americana, widely distributed in the tropics

See also 
 Tallow tree